Get Back is a 1991 concert film starring Paul McCartney that documents The Paul McCartney World Tour of 1989–1990. The film was directed by Richard Lester, who had done two films with McCartney when he was with The Beatles in A Hard Day's Night (1964) and Help! (1965). Lester went into retirement after the release of this film. Carolco Pictures and New Line Cinema, through the Seven Arts joint venture.

Performances
All songs by Lennon–McCartney, except where noted.
"Band on the Run" (Paul and Linda McCartney)
"Got to Get You into My Life"
"Rough Ride" (McCartney)
"The Long and Winding Road"
"The Fool on the Hill"
"Sgt. Pepper's Lonely Hearts Club Band"
"Good Day Sunshine"
"I Saw Her Standing There"
"Put It There" (McCartney)
"Eleanor Rigby"
"Back in the U.S.S.R."
"This One" (McCartney)
"Can't Buy Me Love"
"Coming Up" (McCartney)
"Let It Be"
"Live and Let Die" (Paul and Linda McCartney)
"Hey Jude"
"Yesterday"
"Get Back"
"Golden Slumbers"
"Carry That Weight"
"The End"
"Birthday" (Audio only)

References

External links

Paul McCartney video albums
1991 films
Films directed by Richard Lester
Allied Filmmakers films
Carolco Pictures films